is a Japanese former football player and manager. He last played for and managed the Japan national team. He currently chairman of FC Imabari.

Club career

Okada was born in Osaka on August 25, 1956. After graduating from Waseda University, he joined Japan Soccer League (JSL) club Furukawa Electric in 1980. In 1982, the club won 1982 JSL Cup. In 1986, the club won JSL and JSL Cup and he was selected Best Eleven. The club also won 1986 Asian Club Championship. This is the first Asian champions as Japanese club. He retired in 1990. He played 189 games and scored 9 goals in the league.

International career
On June 9, 1980, Okada debuted for Japan national team against Hong Kong. In 1982, he selected Japan for 1982 Asian Games. At the Asian Games, he played two games and scored a goal against South Korea. He also played in the 1980 Summer Olympics qualification and in the 1986 FIFA World Cup qualification. He played 24 games and scored 1 goal for Japan until 1985.

Coaching career
After retirement, Okada started  his coaching career at Furukawa Electric (later JEF United Ichihara) in 1990. In 1995, he became a coach for the Japan national team. During the 1998 World Cup qualification Final round in October 1997, Japan's manager Shu Kamo was sacked and Okada was named his successor. In November, Okada led Japan to qualify for the 1998 World Cup for the first time in Japan's history. At the 1998 World Cup, Japan lost all 3 matches and he resigned after the World Cup.

In 1999, Okada signed with J2 League club Consadole Sapporo. In 2000, he led the club to win the J2 League and promoted the club to the J1 League. He resigned at the end of the 2001 season. In 2003, he signed with Yokohama F. Marinos. The club won the league title and he was also awarded Best Manager for 2 years in a row in 2003 and 2004. From 2005, the club performance was sluggish and he resigned in August 2006.

In November 2007, Japan national team manager Ivica Osim suffered a cerebral infarction. In December, Okada was named a new manager for Japan. In 2008, he selected numerous new young players, including Atsuto Uchida, Shinji Kagawa, Yuto Nagatomo, Keisuke Honda, Shinji Okazaki and many others. In 2009, Japan qualified for the 2010 World Cup. Okada gained worldwide attention for leading Japan to ninth-place finish in the 2010 World Cup. He was commended for turning his Japanese team of young, inexperienced players into a slick passing, talented squad of youngsters. He resigned after the 2010 World Cup. In November, he was awarded AFC Coach of the Year.

Okada signed a contract with Chinese Super League side Hangzhou Greentown on 14 December 2011. He extended his contract for two years in the end of 2012 season. However, he resigned from Hangzhou on 5 November 2013.

In November 2014, he bought a majority stake in FC Imabari and became a chairman of the club. In March 2016, he became a vice-president of Japan Football Association and served until March 2018.

Career statistics

Club

International

Managerial statistics

Honours

As player
Furukawa Electric
Japan Soccer League: 1985–86
Asian Club Championship: 1986

Individual
Japan Soccer League Best Eleven: 1985–86

As Manager
Yokohama F. Marinos
J.League Division 1: 2003, 2004

Individual
AFC Coach of the Month: November 1997
J.League Manager of the Year: 2003, 2004
AFC Coach of the Year: 2010
Japan Football Hall of Fame: Inducted in 2019

References

External links
 
 
 Japan National Football Team Database
 
 Biography

1956 births
Living people
Waseda University alumni
Association football people from Osaka Prefecture
Sportspeople from Osaka
Japanese footballers
Japan international footballers
Japan Soccer League players
JEF United Chiba players
Japanese football managers
Japanese expatriate football managers
J1 League managers
J2 League managers
Japan national football team managers
Hokkaido Consadole Sapporo managers
Yokohama F. Marinos managers
Zhejiang Professional F.C. managers
Expatriate football managers in China
Japanese expatriate sportspeople in China
1998 FIFA World Cup managers
2010 FIFA World Cup managers
Footballers at the 1982 Asian Games
Association football defenders
FC Imabari
Asian Games competitors for Japan